Lambertia uniflora is a shrub in the family Proteaceae. Endemic to the moist south-west corner of Western Australia, it grows to 3 metres in height. Single axillary or terminal flowers appear between October and January in the species' native range. These are orange or red with a yellow or yellow-green limb. This species first appeared in the scientific literature in 1810, authored by the prolific Scottish botanist, Robert Brown.

References

Eudicots of Western Australia
uniflora
Endemic flora of Southwest Australia